James Cyrus Stewart (born March 2, 1978) is an American musician and writer best known for his role in experimental rock band Xiu Xiu. He has appeared in other bands, including XXL, Former Ghosts, and Sal Mineo.

Early life and career 
Stewart was born in 1978 and raised in Los Angeles. He was in several bands before Xiu Xiu, beginning in his youth. While in school, he played in a parody band and a Bauhaus cover band. After high school, he played bass in a group with guitarist Kenny Lyon and members from bands such as Devo, Geza X, The Screamers, and Sparks. Stewart has said that this experience was particularly formative for his career, but he did not realize this at the time. He later quit the band and moved home to attend college. During this period, he came out to his parents, although this was not received warmly.

 At home, Stewart briefly played in several other bands before being kicked out, and a high school friend suggested that he start his own band, which became IBOPA. His father also played in the band, and Stewart also played with Korea Girl during this period. Metro Silicon Valley described IBOPA as a collision of "dance, lounge, disco, and ska" with the horror of Red Asphalt, and noted the band for bringing attention to South Bay music. IBOPA was briefly signed to an Elektra Records subsidiary in 1999, and broke up in July 1999 when the label dropped most of its artists. The band announced that five of its members—Stewart, Cory McCulloch, Kurt Stumbaugh, Tim Kirby, and Don Dias—would continue into a new acoustic and experimental band called Ten in the Swear Jar.

 Ten in the Swear Jar (XITSJ) continued IBOPA's "unusual approach" with eccentric and erratic music. Metros David Espinoza described the band as "futuristic in instrumentation and erratic in mentality" with the traditional instrumentation backgrounded by baritone saxophones, banjos, accordions, and synthesizers. He added that the band's sound was minimalistic and that the unusual instruments were not used to excess. XITSJ members included Jason Albertini of Duster and Miya Osaki of The Chinkees and The Bruce Lee Band, as well as Don Dias, the namesake of Xiu Xiu's song "Don Diasco". XITSJ disbanded in September 2002 and Stewart formed Xiu Xiu.

Xiu Xiu 

Stewart started his third band, Xiu Xiu, with Cory McCullouch (from XITSJ), Yvonne Chen, and Lauren Andrews. The band forgoes traditional rock instruments for programmed drums, indigenous instruments, and others including harmonium, mandolin, brass bells, gongs, keyboards, and a cross between a guitarrón mexicano and a cello for bass. Metro Silicon Valleys David Espinoza likened Stewart to an explorer charting new territories of sound in 2001 as he started Xiu Xiu. He compared Stewart's voice to a combination of Robert Smith's in its fragility and The Downward Spiral-era Trent Reznor's in its anger, and noted Stewart's deliberate choice of tone in light of the individual instruments' disparate wackiness. The name Xiu Xiu, pronounced "shoe shoe", is taken from the titular character of the 1998 film Xiu Xiu: The Sent Down Girl. In Stewart's description, the film's theme is that of no resolution—that awful things happen to the protagonist throughout the film and she ultimately dies, tragically, at the end. The band found its first tracks to match the "rotten realness" spirit of the film, "that sometimes life turns out with a worst possible case scenario". Stewart said Tracy Chapman's "Fast Car", which Xiu Xiu covered on A Promise, had a similar theme.

Stewart visited Vietnam around 2001, where he took the picture that appears on the cover of A Promise. To afford the trip, he opened his equipment to local punk and ska bands as a recording studio. Stewart described the period between Knife Play and A Promise as full of "really bad things" in his personal life. In 2003, Stewart said that he had been very influenced by gamelan and Korean and Japanese folk music, and that he had been listening primarily to contemporary classical and "gay dance music".

Brandon Stosuy of Pitchfork said that Stewart, "one of underground music's consistently brilliant anomalies", "came into his own" on A Promise, and that his vocal style was compared with Robert Smith, Annie Lennox, and Michael McDonald. He noted a "continual poetic and romantic beauty" behind "the violence" in Stewart's lyrics.

The tone of 2004's Fabulous Muscles reflected an "incredibly, incredibly violent, incredibly jarring, and difficult to take" string of events in Stewart's life.

When interviewing for The Air Force in 2006, Stewart said that the year was "one of the first not dominated by personal tragedies", though the tone of the album reflects his experience internalizing the events of the previous years, which he felt was "almost more difficult".

Other works 
Stewart released an album with Eugene Robinson of Oxbow as Xiu Xiu & Eugene Robinson Present: Sal Mineo on Important Records in April 2013. He has also appeared in the album Christmas Island by Andrew Jackson Jihad. In addition, he has released an album with Jonathan Meiburg of Shearwater under the name Blue Water White Death.

Outside of music, Stewart said that he had written a "failed attempt" at a humorous novel based on "very, very peculiar sexual encounters" he had through his life. He wrote for two years ending in 2005, and circulated the book to friends. Among his favorite authors, he listed Yukio Mishima, Dennis Cooper, Charles Bukowski, and Kenzaburō Ōe.

Personal life
Stewart is openly bisexual, and has identified as queer. He is the son of Michael Gassen Stewart, the nephew of John Coburn Stewart, the half-brother of sociologist Benjamin H. Bratton, and the "long-lost" cousin of former Xiu Xiu member and multi-instrumentalist Caralee McElroy. 

Stewart's father and uncle were both musicians and songwriters: Michael was the co-founder and guitarist of 1960s folk-rock group We Five and a music producer. John was a former member of folk/pop music group The Kingston Trio, largely credited with helping launch the folk music revival of the late 1950s to the late 1960s, and later found success as a singer-songwriter; he is perhaps best known as the songwriter of The Monkees' 1967 No. 1 hit "Daydream Believer." "Mike", the closing track from Xiu Xiu's 2004 album Fabulous Muscles, concerns Jamie's reaction to his father's suicide in 2002.

Stewart has, on multiple occasions, referred to bandmate Angela Seo as his "best friend".

See also 

 Accordion Solo!

Notes and references 

 Notes

 References

External links 

 

1978 births
American experimental musicians
American indie rock musicians
American rock songwriters
American rock singers
Queer musicians
LGBT people from California
American LGBT singers
Living people
Musicians from Los Angeles
American post-punk musicians
Queer men
Synth-pop singers
Articles containing video clips
Singer-songwriters from California
21st-century American singers
21st-century American male singers
Bisexual musicians
Bisexual men
American male singer-songwriters